Friedenberg may refer to:
 Friedenberg, Missouri, United States
 Edgar Z. Friedenberg (1921–2000), American scholar
 Johnny Sequoyah Friedenberg (born 2002), American actress
 Judi Friedenberg (born 1950), American bridge player
 Michael Friedenberg, American media executive
 Richard Friedenberg, American screenwriter and director